bp: pushing the boundaries is a Canadian short documentary film, directed by Brian Nash and released in 1997. The film is a portrait of the life and career of Canadian experimental poet bpNichol.

The film premiered at the 1997 Toronto International Film Festival, where it received an honorable mention from the jury for the Best Canadian Short Film award. It was a Genie Award nominee for Best Short Documentary at the 19th Genie Awards in 1999.

References

External links

1997 films
1997 documentary films
Canadian short documentary films
English-language Canadian films
1990s Canadian films
Documentary films about poets